is a Japanese professional football club based in Ise, Mie Prefecture. They play in Tōkai Adult Soccer League.

History
The club was founded on 2006 as Pixy BC. Former player Ichizo Nakata contributed in the club relocation to the Ise City, making it their new hometown at the Mie Prefecture.

It led the club to be renamed as FC Ise-Shima on 2013, when the club was playing on Mie's 2nd division. The club saw three back-to-back promotions from prefectural to regional level, debuting at the first division of the Tōkai Adult Soccer League on 2016. The club has not been relegated or had even been outside of the Top 4 ever since. They had the opportunity to be promoted to the Japan Football League a couple of times through the Japanese Regional Football Champions League, even finishing at fourth place at the 2021 edition of the competition. However, it was not enough to give them promotion.

League & cup record 

Key

Honours
Mie Prefecture League Division 2
Champions (2): 2008, 2013
Tokai Adult Soccer Tournament
Champions (1): 2014

Current squad

Club staff

See also 
 Japan Football Association (JFA)

References

External links 
 Official website 

Football clubs in Japan